The 1997 Grote Prijs Jef Scherens was the 31st edition of the Grote Prijs Jef Scherens cycle race and was held on 7 September 1997. The race started and finished in Leuven. The race was won by Stéphane Hennebert.

General classification

References

1997
1997 in road cycling
1997 in Belgian sport